Bhadla Solar Park is the largest solar park in the world as of 2022 and is spread over a total area of  in Bhadla, Phalodi tehsil, Jodhpur district, Rajasthan, India.

The park has a total capacity of 2245 MW.

Location
The region has been described as "almost unlivable" due to its climate.

Auctions

Phase I 
In the first phase, NTPC Limited auctioned 420 MW of capacity split into 6 packages of 70 MW each. The Finnish company Fortum quoted the lowest tariff of 4.34/kW⋅h. Rising Sun Energy and Solairedirect won 2 packages, each quoting a price of 4.35/kW⋅h. Yarrow Infrastructure won the remaining package quoting a price of 4.36/kW⋅h.

In December 2016, Solairedirect signed an agreement with Ecoppia, a PV panel cleaning solutions developer, to provide automated cleaning solutions to the project. Due to the park's location in a desert region, it is prone to dust storms.

Phase II 
The Solar Energy Corporation of India (SECI) auctioned 250 MW capacity in the second phase for which 27 firms submitted bids.

Phase III 
SECI auctioned 500 MW capacity in the third phase on 11 May 2017. ACME commissioned the 200 MW capacity in September 2018.

SECI also actioned 500 MW for on December 22, 2017. The Hero Future Energies has been awarded 300 MW and SoftBank Group 200 MW.

Phase IV 
SECI auctioned 250 MW capacity in the fourth phase on 9 May 2017.

South Africa's Phelan Energy Group and Avaada Power were awarded 50 MW and 100 MW of capacity, respectively. Their bids of 2.62 per kilowatt-hour were the lowest tariffs for any solar power project in India. SBG Cleantech, a consortium of Softbank Group, Airtel and Foxconn, was awarded the remaining 100 MW capacity at a rate of 2.63/kW⋅h.

SECI tendered bids for the remaining 750 MW capacity in June 2017. In this way, the entire solar park will be completed by December 2018, and with 2055 MW installed capacity, it will be the one of the world's largest solar parks.

Commissioning
On 22 February 2017, NTPC announced that it had commissioned 115 MW of capacity at the park. An additional 45 MW of capacity was commissioned on 8 March, and 25 MW on 18 March. NTPC announced the commissioning of 20 MW capacity at the park on 23 March, and 55 MW on 25 March 2017, taking the total commissioned capacity of the Bhadla park to 260 MW. In September 2018, 1365 MW had been commissioned.

See also

 Ultra Mega Solar Power Projects
 Solar power in India

References

External links 

 SOLAR PARK, BHADLA, PHASE-II
World's largest solar power plant

Solar power stations in Rajasthan
Jodhpur district
Photovoltaic power stations in India
2017 establishments in Rajasthan
Energy infrastructure completed in 2017
Thar Desert